Brian Harnetty (born May 10, 1973) is an American interdisciplinary artist and composer who uses sound and listening to foster social change. His work brings together sound archives, performance, ecology, and place, and is focused on local and regional issues of Appalachia and the Midwest.

Harnetty studied music composition with Michael Finnissy at the Royal Academy of Music, and studied interdisciplinary arts and music composition at Ohio University and The Ohio State University. He has taught music and interdisciplinary arts at Kenyon College, Goddard College, and Ohio University.

Harnetty's music is released on Karl, Dust-to-Digital, Atavistic, Winesap, and Scioto Records. His 2009 release, Silent City, featured singer Will Oldham on three tracks. His 2019 release, Shawnee, Ohio, received five out of five stars from Mojo Magazine, and both Shawnee, Ohio and his 2013 release, The Star-Faced One: from the Sun Ra/El Saturn Archives were named Mojo's "Underground Album of the Year."

As an author, Harnetty has written for New Music Box, Experimental Music Yearbook, Sound Effects, and Cultural Studies.

Music 
Harnetty is known for working with sound archives as compositional source material. He uses field recordings alongside ambient, folk, and experimental soundscapes as a way to evoke both memory and history. His process has been compared to "working like a novelist...to create a new text, breathing new life into old chunks of sound by radically recontextualising them."

Many of his pieces transform archival material––including field recordings, transcriptions, and historic recordings––into newly re-imagined sound collages. Harnetty works closely with archivists, historians, and communities connected to sound archives. He uses the practice of "sonic ethnography," referred to as "the study of people, place, and culture through sound" and "the practice of listening and experiencing." Harnetty has done recording projects with the Berea College Appalachian Sound Archives in Kentucky; the Sun Ra/El Saturn Creative Audio Archive in Chicago; and the Little Cities of Black Diamonds Archives in Shawnee, Ohio, and the Anne Grimes Collection in the Library of Congress.

Interdisciplinary Art and Social Practice
Since 2010, Harnetty has worked in Appalachian Ohio, producing sound and listening projects across the disciplines of sound art, installation, performance, music composition, video, and writing, all with a focus on social practice. These projects reflect the history, landscape, and people of the region, and offer listening methods as a means to enact social change. The work’s themes include energy extraction, inequitable economies, environmental degradation and recovery, land use, and divisions between rural and urban people. In each project, Harnetty’s uses “contemplative listening” as his primary method, which brings together the environment, attentive listening, and mindfulness. He uses contemplative listening to move between the tensions of reflection and social action.

Honors and awards
 MAP Fund Grant (2020) 
 Individual Artist Excellence Award, Ohio Arts Council (2020) 
 MOJO Magazine, 2019 Underground Album of the Year (2019)
 Loghaven Artist Residency, Tennessee (2019)
 Marble House Project Artist Residency, Vermont (2019)
 A Blade of Grass Fellow for Contemplative Practice (2018)
 Creative Capital award for Performing Arts (2016)
 National Performance Network Residency Grant (2016)
 Individual Artist Excellence Award, Ohio Arts Council (2016)
 MOJO Magazine, 2013 Underground Album of the Year (2013)
 Paste Magazine, Artist of the Week (2009)
 Artist in Residence, Headlands Center for the Arts, California (2005)
 Individual Artist Excellence Award, Ohio Arts Council (2003)

Discography 
 Desire and Winter Birds,  (Tell-All, 2006)
 American Winter,  (Atavistic, 2007)
 Silent City,  (Atavistic, 2009)
 The Sociophonic Key,  (Scioto, 2012)
 The Star-Faced One: From the Sun Ra/El Saturn Archives, (Atavistic, 2013)
 Rawhead & Bloodybones, (Dust-to-Digital, 2015)
 Wayne National Forest, (Winesap, 2019)
 Shawnee, Ohio, (Karlrecords, 2019)
 Many Hands (vol. 1), (Winesap, 2019)
 Many Hands (vol. 2), (Winesap, 2020)

External links 
 Official site

References 

1973 births
Living people
American male composers
21st-century American composers
21st-century American male musicians
Atavistic Records artists